The women's 4 × 100 metres relay at the 2015 World Championships in Athletics was held at the Beijing National Stadium on 29 August.

Summary
It is a rare chance for all the best athletes in a country to get together to run a relay, it takes a major championship.  In the heats, Canada, the Netherlands and Trinidad and Tobago set National Records to get to the finals, T&T did so while resting anchor runner Semoy Hackett for the finals.  Jamaica rested two, Veronica Campbell-Brown and Elaine Thompson, but not their superstar Shelly-Ann Fraser-Pryce, in order to make six girls eligible for medals.  Jamaica was the number one qualifier.  USA ran their A team, to assure qualification but not resting their workhorse Allyson Felix even though Tori Bowie, Dezerea Bryant and Kaylin Whitney had been listed as their entries, unlisted Jasmine Todd anchored.

In the finals Jamaica was out early with Campbell-Brown and a quick handoff to Natasha Morrison.  Kseniya Ryzhova left too early and Russia never made a handoff, while USA looked to proportionally hold their own against the stagger through the backstretch with Felix.  Trinidad and Tobago was also in position, while Dafne Schippers ran past Canada's Kimberly Hyacinthe on the outside.  Jamaica continued to build their lead with Elaine Thompson through the tour, handing off smoothly to Shelly-Ann Fraser-Pryce in first place, who further extended their lead.  USA was a clear second and Trinidad and Tobago clearly third, each with enough separation that places would not change to the finish.  Behind them, the Netherlands was just slightly ahead of the British and German teams.  Desiree Henry ran away from the others and was closing on Hackett, while the Dutch team's illegal handover earned them a disqualification.

The Jamaican team set a new National Record and the Championship Record, Trinidad and Tobago improved theirs from earlier in the day and the British team set their National Record.  In all, five teams set their National Record.

Records
Prior to the competition, the records were as follows:

Qualification standards

Schedule

Results

Heats
Qualification: First 3 of each heat (Q) plus the 2 fastest times (q) advance to the final.

Final
The final was held at 20:45.

References

4 x 100 metres relay
Relays at the World Athletics Championships
2015 in women's athletics